2020 Lithuanian Baseball League was the 34th annual edition of the Lithuanian Baseball League, organised by the Lithuanian Baseball Association. Due to the COVID-19 pandemic in Lithuania, only four teams participated in the championships, in comparison to usual 12 teams format. The finals were played on 12-13 September 2020.

Regular season

Regular season best players

Finals

Bronze final

Golden final

References

External links 
  Lithuanian baseball association

Lithuanian Baseball League
2020 in Lithuanian sport
2020 in baseball